Frank Pearce Sturm (1879–1942) was an English poet and translator, known for his 1906 translations of Baudelaire; his short poem Still-heart is a popular favourite.

During the 1920s he was a collaborator and correspondent of W. B. Yeats, particularly in matters of astrology.

References
Frank Pearce Sturm: His Life, Letters and Collected Work (1969) Richard Taylor

English translators
1879 births
1942 deaths
English male poets
English male non-fiction writers